Festucalex erythraeus, known commonly as the red pipefish, is a species of marine pipefish of the family Syngnathidae. It is found throughout the Indo-Pacific, from Mozambique and South Africa to Hawaii, Honshu (Japan), and New Caledonia. They are expected to feed on small crustaceans, such as gammarid shrimps, mysids, and harpacticoid copepods. This species is ovoviviparous, with males brooding eggs and giving birth to live young. It is exported from Hawaii as part of the aquarium trade. 

Festucalex amakusensis and Festucalex townsendi which some authorities consider to be synonyms of F. erythraeus are considered by other authorities to be valid species.

References

Further reading
WoRMS
Encyclopedia of Life

red pipefish
red pipefish